Vibrio diabolicus is a polysaccharide-secreting bacterium isolated from a deep-sea hydrothermal vent polychaete annelid, Alvinella pompejana. It is facultatively anaerobic, heterotrophic, and mesophilic.

References

Further reading
Keymer, Daniel Paul. A Multiphasic Study of Patterns in Diversity and Structure Within a Coastal Vibrio cholerae Population. ProQuest, 2009.
Hidalgo, Roxana Beaz, Jesús L. Romalde, and Susana Prado. "Identificación de bacterias del género Vibrio asociadas al cultivo de la almeja." Caracterización y patogénesis. Revista AquaTIC 36 (2012): 1–2.

External links
LPSN
WORMS

Vibrionales
Bacteria described in 1997